Feldru is a commune in Bistrița-Năsăud County, Transylvania, Romania. It is composed of two villages, Feldru and Nepos (Várorja).

References

Communes in Bistrița-Năsăud County
Localities in Transylvania